The First Presbyterian Church was built in 1907 and is located just one block west of the current downtown business district in Coweta, Oklahoma. The building was added to the NRHP in 2003.

History
The First Presbyterian Church was built in 1907 in a late Gothic Revival style. By 1908, the building was closed due to the roof falling inward. However, the roof was fixed and a year later it was re-opened. By 1918, there were 34 members of the church. Around the 1950s-60s, the church was closed and abandoned. The building is no longer used as a church, and in 1972, it became the Mission Bell Museum. The building is now home to historic memorabilia and the 36 original church pews.

The chandelier in the center of the room was reportedly brought by boat down the Ohio and Mississippi Rivers and up the Arkansas River in the spring of 1907. Supposedly, the whole town turned out to meet the boat when it arrived at Coweta landing. The chandelier has since been wired, and rewired, for electricity.

Citations

External links
Coweta's Mission Bell Museum & Information Center - Information from Travel Oklahoma

Churches on the National Register of Historic Places in Oklahoma
Buildings and structures in Wagoner County, Oklahoma
Presbyterian churches in Oklahoma
Coweta, Oklahoma
History museums in Oklahoma
Museums in Wagoner County, Oklahoma
Gothic Revival church buildings in Oklahoma
National Register of Historic Places in Wagoner County, Oklahoma